The 1916 United States presidential election in Utah took place on November 7, 1916. All contemporary forty-eight states were part of the 1916 United States presidential election. State voters chose four electors to the Electoral College, who voted for president and vice president. This was the first election featuring as a distinct voting unit Duchesne County, which had been split from Wasatch County in 1915.

In the preceding 1912 presidential election, Utah had been one of only two states (the other being strongly Republican Vermont) to give a plurality to incumbent President William Howard Taft. However, in contrast to the East where supporters of Theodore Roosevelt's "Bull Moose" Party rapidly returned to the Republicans, in the Mountain States many if not most of these supporters turned to the Democratic Party not only in presidential elections, but also in state and federal legislative ones. Another factor helping Wilson was a powerful "peace vote" in the Western states due to opposition to participation in World War I, and a third was that a considerable part of the substantial vote for Socialist candidate Eugene Debs from the previous election was turned over to Wilson owing to such progressive reforms as the Sixteenth and Seventeenth Amendments. A fourth factor was that Taft had support from the Mormon hierarchy that commanded the loyalty of most of Utah's population – which caused Utah to remain largely loyal to him amidst the GOP split – but the LDS Church did not maintain support with Hughes.

The combined result was that Wilson was able to make Utah his second-strongest victory outside of the "Solid South" – in a state that four years previously had given him his seventh-lowest popular vote proportion. Utah was his eleventh-best state overall and voted 17.83 percentage points more Democratic than the nation at-large. Wilson swept every county in the state, including rock-ribbed Republican Kane County, which had been Taft's third-strongest county nationwide in 1912, which has never otherwise supported a Democrat for president, and where otherwise only William Jennings Bryan in 1896 and Franklin D. Roosevelt in 1936 have as Democrats received so much as one third of the vote.

Results

Results by county

See also
 United States presidential elections in Utah

References

1916 Utah elections
Utah
1916